Papyrus Oxyrhynchus 212 (P. Oxy. 212 or P. Oxy. II 212) consists of three fragments of a comedy of Aristophanes, written in Greek. It was discovered in Oxyrhynchus. The manuscript was written on papyrus in the form of a roll. It is dated to the first or second century. Currently it is housed in the British Library (Department of Manuscripts, 782) in London.

Description 
The document was written by an unknown copyist. The measurements of the fragment are 219 by 116 mm.  The text is written in a large round upright uncial hand. There is a tendency to separate words.

The hands of two correctors may be distinguished.

It was discovered by Grenfell and Hunt in 1897 in Oxyrhynchus, together with a large number of documents dated in the reigns of Vespasian, Domitian, and Trajan. The text was published by Grenfell and Hunt in 1899.

See also 
 Oxyrhynchus Papyri
 Papyrus Oxyrhynchus 211
 Papyrus Oxyrhynchus 213

References 

212
1st-century manuscripts
2nd-century manuscripts
British Library collections